Both Sindhi women and men wear the shalwar qameez or the kurta with pyjama. Women wear sari or ghagra. However, before the adoption of the Shalwar kameez and the kurta, the sari as well as other articles of clothing, Sindhis had their own traditional costumes.

Background
Original dress code of Sindhi women was Lehnga Choli with long veil, up until the 1840s, women started wearing the suthan underneath the lehnga, later on around 1930s with time Sindhi women stopped wearing lehnga and only wore sindhi suthan and choli got replaced by long cholo, and men originally wore Dhoti/Lungi and a long or short angrakho later angrakho was replaced by sindhi kurta called Pehriyan and dhoti/lungi was replaced by Sindhi salwar/suthan/kancha.

In the past, the younger women wore velvet or amber pyjama (suthan) both at home and outside. Also they wore a long skirt (jablo) on top and a thick poplin blouse (koti) and a white rawa (a muslin head scarf). Middle aged and young ladies wore churidar pyjama (sorhi suthan). Elderly ladies used to wear a white sheet (chaadar) to cover her body with only a peep hole (akhiri) deftly contrived. Over time, older ladies started to wear the Salwar Kurta with Slippers (sapato).

The original dress of the Sindhi male was a Dhoti/Lungi, jamo/angrakho (top) and achi pagirhi (White Turban) and a block printed shawl called ajrak or other shawls locally made. Men also carry different colored floral/checkered piece of cloth on shoulder or as turban, also used as handkerchief. The traditional clothes of Sindh can still be seen on men and women today.

Traditional clothing
During the medieval period and prior to the Mughal rule, the costumes worn by the people of Sindh resembled the dresses worn in Iraq and adjoining countries. The dresses included short tunics and Iraqi style long robes. If any drawers were used, they were of the Iraqi style, such as the pantaloons which were also adopted in neighbouring Multan and also in the coastal areas of Gujarat. However, the use of such Iraqi clothes in Sindh was limited to Mansura, the Arab capital city, established 712 C.E. and was not universally adopted throughout the region. Arab rule in Sindh ended in 1050 C.E. Further, alongside these dresses, Sindhis also wore other traditional attire.

Traditional Sindhi kancha (shalwar)

The traditional Sindhi drawers are the shalwar style adopted from Iraq and neighbouring countries. The Sindhi shalwar, also called kancha,  can be described as wide pantaloons which do not begin to gather at the knees as does the modern Sindhi suthan, and are wide at the ankles.  The Sindhi shalwar is plaited at the waist. Both garments are loose down to the ankles, where they are gathered. Both garments have the same origins in the pantaloons of Iraq, which are still worn by the Kurds.

The Sindhi shalwar however, was not universally adopted in the region, where it was limited to Mansura. In time too, Arab rule which introduced the Iraqi dress, ended in the 11th century. Accordingly, the traditional Sindhi shalwar qamees.

It is not until the migration of people from Balochistan beginning during the 15th century C.E. and picking up pace during the 18th century C.E. that the use of the shalwar in Sindh was introduced on a wide level. However, the Sindhi shalwar, as the earlier version worn in Mansura, is not as wide and loose as the Balochi shalwar, which is very wide and loose.

A suthan is traditionally tight fitting below the knees or around the ankles whereas any style of shalwar is loosely gathered at the ankles and does not tighten towards the lower parts of the legs.

Although it was not customary for women to wear the suthan during the early 19th century, men were seen wearing the traditional pantaloon style Sindhi shalwar/suthan during this period. However, the suthan was not universally adopted by members of all religions to begin with, but in 1872 it was noted that the use had spread to a wider audience.

Female dress
Dresses

Sindhi women traditionally wore sindhi lehenga choli and today sindhi women most commonly wear the Sindhi salwar cholo and a long veil with sindhi  embroidery called bhart. Bhart varies from tribe to tribe and region to region, Traditional dress lehnga choli called Paro choli/jablo choli or ghaghro choli is also worn today in some parts of sindh, some muslim women wear cholo instead of choli a long blouse reaching to ankles, sindhi traditional women clothes are most vibrant and colorful with sindhi embroideries and mirror work, the various local floral prints, the Bandhani fabric (tie and dye technique, which is believed to be orignated from Sindh), the block printed fabric and the Sussi fabric is also very famous of Sindh. A full embroidered shirt is called Gaj. Some jut women in lower delta region of sindh wear a long robe like dresses and some baloch women in sindh wear a frock like dress with a pocket infront called ghagho. The traditional clothes are worn with traditional silver and gold jewellery as well, The white full arm bangles are famous from mohen jo Daro, originally made out of ivory but today made from plastic.

Lengha choli
Before the advent of the suthan and Sindhi cholo, the traditional dress was lengha (jablo) choli which is still worn by women in various parts of Sindh. Women in the Thakparkar district wear a ghagra, a heavier version of the lehnga, with either a loose or fitted choli, or a kancera, a fully embroidered, backless blouse, held on by small cap sleeves and strings.

Another upper garment is the gaji (pullover shirt) which is worn in the mountain areas of Sindh. The gaji is composed of small, square panels, embroidered on silk and sequins. The neck line of the gaji is cut high, and round on one side, with a slit opening extending the other. Unmarried girls wear the opening to the back and married women, to the front.

The original outfit does not require a woman to wear a suthan underneath the lengha, and up until the 1840s, the skirt was commonly worn on its own. Accordingly, the suthan for women is a relatively late adoption. In parts of Sindh, the skirt is worn without the suthan.

Sindhi Suthan and Sindhi cholo

Modern Suthan (chareno)
By the 1930s, the suthan, similar to the shalwar became the traditional lower garment worn by women in Sindh. The Sindhi suthan, also called chareno, is similar to the Punjabi suthan of the Punjab region, is  heavily pleated, voluminous on the thighs, slightly narrowed on the knees, gathered in at the instep and pleated to the ankles.

Cholo
The Sindhi suthan was traditionally accompanied by the Sindhi cholo (boddice) and paro (petticoat/ghagra) but now is worn with a cholo (kameez) only which is loose fitting, and is made in a variety of ways, including the traditional method of the cholo opening at the front to the waist, with very wide sleeves. The traditional cholo can reach down to the ankles.

Women generally wear a dupatta or odani (Veil) with the Sindhi suthan and Sindhi cholo suit to cover their head and shoulders. In the past, women wore a thin muslin scarf (rawa) bigger than the present day dupattas.

Sindhi Julaba
Very loose ankle length garment in hand loom or hand-blocked material with a hood attached, with tie string at "V" opening in the neck and side slits at lower part extending to lower hem. Worn with or without hood in the villages of Sindh and can also be embroidered.

Male dress

Sindhi Suthan and Sindhi angelo

The other outfit worn by males is the modern Sindhi suthan with the traditional peheren (Sindhi shirt) which is also called angerkho, a short form of the kurta and fastened to the side.  An alternative name for the top is angeli which is short and left-crossed, covering the chest, the shoulders and the arms. The sleeves are long and pleated. Large and wide pleats cover the belly. The other upper garment is the traditional garment similar to a long gown.

Sindhi caps

Sindh has its own variety of hats/caps.

Sindhi cap. The sindhi topi is a cylindrical skullcap with an arch shaped cut-out on the frontal side. The hat is embroidered with intricate geometrical designs with small pieces of mirrors or gemstones sewed into it.

Talpur Hat/Serai Hat.  The Talpur hat also called serai topi were unusual hats were usually made in brightly coloured velvets or flamboyant brocades, always with the contrasting panels at centre back and front of the drum. They were worn throughout the 19th century by muslims in Sindh. Originally monopolised by government officials and lawyers.

Ajrak

The block printed shawl known as Ajrak is used by men, women wear Maleer an ajrak version for women.

Modern clothing

Shalwar kameez

Men and women wear the straight cut Punjabi shalwar kameez using local prints and designs.

Sindhi kurta
The Sindhi kurta is the traditional straight cut variety worn in neighbouring Punjab which is becoming increasingly popular in Sindh but uses local patterns to embroidery the garment and also makes use of mirrors. The local art of bandhani (creating patterned textiles by resisting parts of a fabric by tying knots on it before it is dyed) is utilised which is believed to have originated in Sindh and spread to Gujarat via Rajasthan and is also practiced in the Punjab region. Sindhi kurtas are also made out of heavy local material called rilli and the kurtas are often called rilli kurtas. Ajrak prints are also used.

See also
 Shalwar kameez
 Khyber Pakhtunkhwa clothing
 Clothing of Balochistan, Pakistan

References

Sindhi culture
Pakistani clothing by ethnicity